Acianthera odontotepala is a species of orchid plant native to Cuba.

References 

odontotepala
Flora of Cuba
Flora without expected TNC conservation status